The Innovation High School is a four-year public high school in Jersey City in Hudson County, New Jersey, United States, operated as part of the Jersey City Public Schools. It is one of a number of high school programs serving students in ninth through twelfth grades offered by the school district.

As of the 2021–22 school year, the school had an enrollment of 286 students and 24.1 classroom teachers (on an FTE basis), for a student–teacher ratio of 11.9:1. There were 166 students (58.0% of enrollment) eligible for free lunch and 15 (5.2% of students) eligible for reduced-cost lunch.

History
The school, focused on education in STEAM fields, opened with an enrollment of 100 ninth graders in September 2014 as a school-within-a-school at Henry Snyder High School, with the support of the Institute for Student Achievement and New Jersey City University.

Administration
The school's principal is Francis Dooley.

References

External links 
School website
Jersey City Public Schools

School Data for Innovation High School, National Center for Education Statistics

Education in Jersey City, New Jersey
Educational institutions established in 2014
Public high schools in Hudson County, New Jersey
2014 establishments in New Jersey